Marcus Jackson (born November 30, 1986) is a professional arena football and indoor football quarterback who is currently a free agent. Jackson played college football for the TCU Horned Frogs football team.

Early life
Jackson attended Westside High School in Houston, Texas. While at Westside, Jackson was a member of the football team.

Jackson committed to Texas Christian University on January 31, 2005. He choose TCU over football scholarships from Baylor, Houston, Louisiana Tech & Louisiana–Lafayette.

College career
Jackson redshirted his freshman year at TCU, before finding himself as the back up to Jeff Ballard during his redshirt-freshman season. In 2007, Jackson was giving the opportunity to compete for the starting quarterback job, but lost the battle to Andy Dalton. Jackson spent the duration of his career as a backup to Dalton, with the exception of starting two games in 2008 during a Dalton injury.

Statistics
Through end of the 2009 season, Jackson's college statistics are as follows:

Professional career

Wichita Wild
Jackson signed to play indoor football for the Wichita Wild of the Indoor Football League (IFL) for the 2012 season. Jackson helped the Wild finish with an 8-6 record during the regular season, after the team started 0-4. Jackson threw for 19 touchdowns, as well as running in 3 more touchdowns.

Texas Revolution
Jackson played the 2013 indoor season with the expansion Texas Revolution, also of the IFL. The Revolution finished a disappointing 5-9.

San Antonio Talons
Jackson was signed by the San Antonio Talons of the Arena Football League just days prior to the Talon's final game of the season. Following practice, Jackson was named the backup to Robert Kent, but with Kent struggling during the game, Jackson came in for Kent, rushing for 3 touchdowns and throwing for another, upsetting the Philadelphia Soul.

Wichita Falls Nighthawks
In November 2014, Jackson signed with the Wichita Falls Nighthawks of the IFL.

References

1986 births
Living people
American football quarterbacks
TCU Horned Frogs football players
Wichita Wild players
Texas Revolution players
San Antonio Talons players
Wichita Falls Nighthawks players
Players of American football from Houston